The Iremonger Award for Writing on Public Issues is an annual Australian literary prize that was awarded from 2003 to 2009 by Australian publisher Allen & Unwin to commemorate publisher and author John Iremonger and "foster the sort of ideas that he was so good at cultivating". The award is made "for works of political, social and cultural commentary with contemporary Australian relevance" and offers a prize of $10,000 as well as guaranteed publication, royalties and editorial support.

The judges for the first award, made in 2004, included Anne Manne and David Marr. The award has three judges, one from Allen & Unwin and two independent judges who "know what’s happening at the moment and have a unique perspective".

In 2009, Allen and Unwin announced that no manuscript of sufficient merit had been submitted for the award, which would therefore be suspended for the foreseeable future. Should the award be revived, details will be announced on the Allen and Unwin website.

John Iremonger

John Iremonger, who died of cancer in August 2002, worked in the publishing industry in Australia for 35 years. He started the independent publishing company, Hale and Iremonger, in 1977, with Greens MP, Sylvia Hale, but left the partnership in 1980 to join Allen & Unwin when its publishing director Patrick Gallagher offered him a job. Iremonger's career at Allen & Unwin lasted 22 years, which included a four-year break to run Melbourne University Press.<ref>[http://www.festivalnews.uts.edu.au/specialreports/awardhonours_manofpassion.html "Award honours man of passion" in Festival News: The Newsletter of the Sydney Writers' Festival] </ref> He was also an editor of the ANU Historical Journal in 1966, and a member of the editorial committee in 1967.

"He had an enormous impact on Australian publishing. He had a deeply inquiring mind, a strong sense of what was right and wrong and a deep human compassion".

Winners

2004: Australian Heartlands: Making Space for Hope in the Suburbs by Brendan Gleeson
2005: Inside Spin by Bob Burton
2006: The End of Charity by Nic Frances with Maryrose Cuskelly
2007: Once Were Radicals by Irfan Yusuf
2008: A Sorry State of Affairs'' by Stephen Gray

Notes

Australian non-fiction book awards
Awards established in 2003